The following is a list of notable Welsh musicians and musical groups.

Traditional
This category includes music that has its roots in the Middle Ages and Renaissance or the instruments of these periods, as opposed to traditional vocal music or folk music (see below).
Nansi Richards – a triple harp player
Robin Huw Bowen – a triple harp player
Ceri Rhys Matthews – a multi-instrumentalist, plays the pibgorn or Welsh bagpipes, wooden flute, and others
Fernhill – a folk band, that features Ceri Rhys Matthews and often employs the pibgorn
Carreg Lafar – a traditional Welsh folk group, featuring Antwn Owen Hicks, Linda Owen Jones, Rhian Evan Jones, James Rourke and Danny Kilbride

Choirs
Côr Godre'r Aran
Gwalia Singers
Morriston Orpheus Choir
Pontarddulais Male Choir
Treorchy Male Voice Choir

Choral conductors
Sioned James (1974-2016)

Classical
Charlotte Church
Hannah Stone
Rebecca Evans
Bryn Terfel
Gwawr Edwards
Katherine Jenkins
Aled Jones
Catrin Finch
Wynne Evans
Llŷr Williams
Shân Cothi

Folk
Ar Log
Fernhill
Dafydd Iwan
Sian James
Carreg Lafar
Julie Murphy
Max Boyce
Meic Stevens
Morus Elfryn
Roy Harris
Allan Yn Y Fan
 Martyn Joseph
 Novo Amor

Pop, rock and metal

60ft Dolls
The Alarm
Amen Corner 
Anhrefn or Yr Anhrefn
Attack! Attack!
The Automatic
Badfinger
Y Bandana
Billy Bibby & The Wry Smiles
The Blackout
Blonde on Blonde
Bonnie Tyler
Bright Light Bright Light
Budgie
Bullet for My Valentine
Candelas
Catatonia
Cate Le Bon
Catfish and the Bottlemen
Colours of One
Cowbois Rhos Botwnnog
Crys
Cuba Cuba
The Darling Buds
Datblygu
Dave Edmunds
Deke Leonard
Donna Lewis
Ricky Valance
David Alexander
Desecration
Dream State
Dub War
Duffy
Elin Fflur
Euros Childs
Feeder
Funeral for a Friend
Future of the Left
Gene Loves Jezebel
Goldie Lookin Chain
Gorky's Zygotic Mynci
Green Gartside
Gruff Rhys
Gwenno
Himalayas
Holding Absence
Jarcrew
Jayce Lewis
John Cale
John Lawrence (musician)
The Joy Formidable
Karl Wallinger
Kids in Glass Houses
Kristian Lavercombe
Llwybr Llaethog
Lisa Scott-Lee
Los Campesinos!
Lostprophets
Love Sculpture
Man
Manic Street Preachers
Marina and the Diamonds
Mary Hopkin
mclusky
Murry the Hump
Neck Deep
People in Planes
Pino Palladino
Gary Pickford-Hopkins
The Oppressed
Pocket Venus
Pretty Vicious
Roger Glover
Racing Cars
Sassafras
The School
Scritti Politti
Shakin' Stevens
Shirley Bassey
Shooting at Unarmed Men
Sibrydion
Sion Russell Jones
Skindred
Spencer Davis
Stereophonics
Super Furry Animals
Sŵnami
Tigertailz
Tom Jones
Toy Horses
Who's Molly?
World Party 
Young Marble Giants
Yws Gwynedd

Electronic
DJ Sasha
High Contrast
Hybrid
Underworld
Tim Wright aka. CoLD SToRAGE

Bluegrass
The Beef Seeds

References

 
Welsh bands
Musicians
Welsh